Zachery Bradford (born November 29, 1999) is an American athlete specializing in pole vault.

He finished second, behind Armand Duplantis, at 2018 IAAF World U20 Championships in Tampere.  He qualified to the U20 Championships by winning the 2018 USATF U20 Outdoor Championships, setting the meet record in the process.
His outdoor personal best is 5.77 meters, in Lawrence, Kansas, on April 20, 2019.  It is the Kansas Relays meet record.  Later in the 2019 season he won the silver medal at the 2019 NACAC U23 Championships in Athletics sharing the meet record with fellow US vaulter Clayton Fritsch.
Because winner Sam Kendricks was the defending World Champion and later also the 2019 Diamond League Champion, Bradford finishing 4th at the 2019 US outdoor Championships in Des Moines qualified him for World Championships in Doha.

Started his sophomore college indoor season winning 4 of the 5 meets setting meet, facility and Kansas records along the way.  Set a personal indoor best vault of 5.80 at the Tyson Invitational achieving the 2020 Olympic standard.  Qualified for the NCAA Indoor Championships that were later canceled due to the coronavirus pandemic.

While at Bloomington High School in Bloomington, Illinois, he was a three time 3A state champion and currently holds the state meet record at 17' 6".  Holds the all time outdoor state record of 17' 9" (18' 2.50" unattached) and an indoor record of 18' 0.5".

References

External links

American male pole vaulters
1999 births
Living people
Kansas Jayhawks men's track and field athletes